The term Shepherding has a number of uses:

 Sheep farming or sheep husbandry
 The work done by a Shepherd
 Shepherding Movement, a style of Christian discipleship within Charismatic churches

 Shepherding (Australian rules football) - a legal tactic to prevent another player from taking possession of the ball or guide them away from the ball
 The Bushwhackers, the professional wrestling tag team